The 2012 UST Growling Tigers men's basketball team represented University of Santo Tomas in the 75th season of the University Athletic Association of the Philippines. The men's basketball tournament for the school year 2012-2013 began on July 14, 2012 and the host school for the season was National University.

The Tigers made it back to the Finals for the first time since winning the championship in 2006 after finishing the double round-robin eliminations at second place with 10 wins against 4 losses. They defeated the NU Bulldogs who had qualified to the Final Four for the first time in 11 years, and lost to the Ateneo Blue Eagles in the best-of-three championship series via sweep, making their opponents five-peat champions of the tournament.

UST later won the Philippine Collegiate Champions League title in December and avenged their UAAP Finals loss to Ateneo by beating them in a best-of-three series, 2-1.

Jeric Teng, who was named PCCL's tournament MVP missed three games in the elimination round of the UAAP due to an MCL injury in August, while PCCL Coach of the year Pido Jarencio missed Game One of the PCCL Finals when he got infected with measles.

Roster

Depth chart

Roster changes

Subtractions

Additions

Schedule and results

Preseason tournaments 

The Tigers participated in only one offseason tournament, the 2012 Filoil Flying V Preseason Hanes Cup, where they advanced to the quarterfinal round but bid goodbye in the tournament after losing to the NU Bulldogs 68–77.

The Filoil Flying V Preseason Premier Cup games were aired on Studio 23.

UAAP games 

Elimination games were played in a double round-robin format. All games were aired on Studio 23 and Balls. The first game of the Finals series was aired on ABS-CBN and Balls.

Postseason tournament 

Notes

UAAP statistics 

|- bgcolor=#ffffdd
| Karim Abdul || 14 || 14 || style=|34.6 || 89 || 189 || style=|47.1% || 0 || 0 || 0.0% || 59 || 90 || 65.6% || style=|12.2 || 1.9 || style=|1.5 || style=|2.0 || 3.1 || style=|16.9
|-
| Jeric Teng || 11 || 11 || 28.4 || 53 || 139 || 38.1% || 23 || 61 || style=|37.7% || 21 || 31 || 67.7% || 4.3 || 1.1 || 0.6 || 0.0 || 1.9 || 13.6
|- bgcolor=#ffffdd
| Aljon Mariano || 14 || 10 || 28.8 || 73 || 172 || 42.4% || 9 || 25 || 36.0% || 31 || 49 || 63.3% || 7.1 || 2.0 || 0.8 || 0.7 || 3.0 || 13.3
|-
| Tata Bautista || 14 || 0 || 24.3 || 40 || 122 || 32.8% || 26 || 92 || 28.3% || 15 || 20 || 75.0% || 2.9 || 1.8 || 0.6 || 0.1 || 0.9 || 8.6
|- bgcolor=#ffffdd
| Jeric Fortuna || 14 || 14 || 33.8 || 46 || 129 || 35.7% || 7 || 44 || 15.9% || 18 || 22 || 81.8% || 5.1 || style=|5.5 || 1.1 || 0.0 || 1.7 || 8.4
|-
| Kevin Ferrer || 14 || 2 || 20.9 || 26 || 86 || 30.2% || 11 || 45 || 24.4% || 9 || 19 || 47.4% || 4.6 || 1.2 || 0.5 || 0.6 || 1.0 || 5.1
|- bgcolor=#ffffdd
| Louie Vigil || 12 || 5 || 6.8 || 13 || 30 || 43.3% || 3 || 9 || 33.3% || 4 || 9 || 44.4% || 1.3 || 0.3 || 0.3 || 0.1 || 0.6 || 2.9
|-
| Melo Afuang || 14 || 5 || 17.3 || 14 || 46 || 30.4% || 0 || 0 || 0.0% || 3 || 9 || 33.3% || 2.9 || 0.8 || 0.1 || 0.0 || 0.4 || 2.2
|- bgcolor=#ffffdd
| Kim Lo || 14 || 8 || 7.7 || 11 || 28 || 39.3% || 0 || 4 || 0.0% || 5 || 8 || 62.5% || 1.1 || 0.5 || 0.4 || 0.0 || 0.6 || 1.9
|-
| Ed Daquioag || 11 || 1 || 4.4 || 4 || 17 || 23.5% || 2 || 9 || 22.2% || 1 || 1 || style=|100.0% || 0.5 || 0.2 || 0.0 || 0.0 || 0.4 || 1.0
|- bgcolor=#ffffdd
| Paolo Pe || 14 || 0 || 5.6 || 5 || 11 || 45.5% || 0 || 0 || 0.0% || 0 || 0 || 0.0% || 1.1 || 0.1 || 0.1 || 0.0 || 0.3 || 0.7
|-
| Janrey Garrido || 2 || 0 || 1.5 || 0 || 0 || 0.0% || 0 || 0 || 0.0% || 1 || 2 || 50.0% || 0.0 || 0.0 || 0.0 || 0.0 || 1.0 || 0.5
|- bgcolor=#ffffdd
| Robert Hainga || 3 || 0 || 1.7 || 0 || 0 || 0.0% || 0 || 0 || 0.0% || 0 || 0 || 0.0% || 0.3 || 0.0 || 0.0 || 0.3 || 0.0 || 0.0
|-
| Robin Tan || 1 || 0 || 5.0 || 0 || 0 || 0.0% || 0 || 0 || 0.0% || 0 || 0 || 0.0% || 1.0 || 2.0 || 0.0 || 0.0 || 1.0 || 0.0
|- class=sortbottom
! Total || 14 ||  || 41.1 || 375 || 969 || 38.7% || 81 || 292 || 27.7% || 167 || 260 || 64.2% || 44.2 || 15.1 || 6.0 || 3.6 || 14.9 || 71.3
|- class=sortbottom
! Opponents || 14 ||  || 41.1 || 346 || 896 || 38.6% || 80 || 269 || 29.7% || 198 || 296 || 66.9% || 42.6 || 15.6 || 3.9 || 5.2 || 17.3 || 69.3
|}

Source: HumbleBola

Awards

Players drafted into the PBA 
Jeric Fortuna was picked 14th overall in the second round of the 2013 PBA draft by the Bong Ramos-led Barako Bull Energy Cola team.

References 

UST Growling Tigers
UST Growling Tigers basketball team seasons